Microibidion is a genus of beetles in the family Cerambycidae, containing the following species:

 Microibidion bimaculatum Mehl, Galileo, Martins & Santos-Silva, 2015
Microibidion exculptum Martins, 1962
 Microibidion exiguum Martins, 1962
Microibidion fiuzai Santos-Silva, et al., 2020
 Microibidion fluminense (Martins, 1962)
Microibidion kawensis Audureau, 2015
 Microibidion mimicum Martins, 1971
Microibidion morrisi Santos-Silva & Galileo, 2017
 Microibidion muticum (Martins, 1962)
 Microibidion rubicundulum (Gounelle, 1913)

References

Ibidionini